The Ferry terminal Leonsberg is a ferry jetty in the north of Paramaribo, Suriname.  From here various private operators offer transport service the other side of the Suriname river and the Commewijne River.

History 
The first ferry was a motorboat called the "Veerpont No. 1. This daily service was terminated in 1952. Since 1952 various operators offer on demand crossings. Current service include Nieuw Amsterdam and Braamspunt.

References 

Buildings and structures in Paramaribo
Water transport
Transport in Suriname